Miss Thing or Ms. Thing may refer to:

People 
 Ms. Thing (singer), Jamaican dancehall singer

Fiction
 Miss Thing, a character in the play A Kiss for Cinderella (1916)
 Miss Thing, a character in the film You're a Big Boy Now (1966)
 Miss Thing, a character created by cartoonist Joe Johnson (1960s–1970s)
 Miss Thing, a character in the song "I Got My Education" by Uncanny Alliance (1992)
 Miss Thing, a character in the television series The Grimleys (1997)
 Miss Thing, a character in the television series Timmy Towers (1997)
 Ms. Thing (Marvel Comics), a superhero character in Marvel Comics (2012)

Music 
 "Miss Thing", a song by Hubert Laws from the album The Laws of Jazz (1964)
 "Miss Thing", a song by Melba Moore from the album Burn (1979)
 "Miss Thing", a song by Adam Ant from the album Vive Le Rock (1985)

Other uses 
 Ms. Thing, 2010 short film, screenplay by Mette Bach and directed by Karen X. Tulchinsky
 Ms. Thing Productions, a production company for Ella Joyce

See also 
 Everybody's Talkin' 'bout Miss Thing!, album by Lavay Smith & Her Red Hot Skillet Lickers
 "Miss a Thing", song by Kylie Minogue from the album Disco
 Miss Thang, album by Monica
 Mr Thing, hip hop producer
 Thing (disambiguation)